Reece Levi Richard Lyne (born 2 December 1992) is an English rugby league footballer who plays as a   for Wakefield Trinity in the Betfred Super League and England at international level.

He has previously played for Hull F.C. in the Super League, and played on the  earlier in his career.

Background
Lyne was born in Kingston upon Hull, Humberside, England. He is of Jamaican descent.

Early years
He attended David Lister School from 2004 to 2009, and also played for Ideal Isberg Rugby Club during his childhood years.

Playing career
Lyne started his playing career in 2010 at Hull F.C. At the end of the 2012 season he signed a three-year deal with Wakefield Trinity.
Having made his 100th appearance for the club at home to his old club Hull F.C., he wore the number four shirt for the 2017 season.

International career
In July 2018 he was selected in the England Knights Performance squad.

In 2018 he was selected for England against France at the Leigh Sports Village.

He was selected in England 9s squad for the 2019 Rugby League World Cup 9s.

References

External links
Wakefield Trinity profile
Wakefield profile
SL profile

1992 births
Living people
England national rugby league team players
English rugby league players
Hull F.C. players
Rugby league centres
Rugby league fullbacks
Rugby league wingers
Rugby league players from Kingston upon Hull
Wakefield Trinity players
English people of Jamaican descent